Lieutenant-General Chit Swe BC-6463 was a former Minister for Agriculture and Forestry, minister for Co-Operatives and minister for Livestock and Fisheries in Myanmar.

Biography
Chit Swe was born on January 18, 1932, in Matkayay Street, Tin Baw ward, Mawlamyaing in Burma. He is the fourth son of U Hla Baw from A Pon Chan, Mon State and Daw Khin Tint from Chaung Son, Mon State. His parents are Mon natives so he too is a Mon. His Religion is Buddhist. His real name is Chit Swe but he was called "Pwa Pwa" because he was white, strong and fat in childhood. When he was five years old he started attending Mawlamyaing Buddhist High School. His father worked in the post office of Mawlamyaing. 

When his father was promoted to Inspector of Post Offices, at the Post Office of Bago, his whole family moved to Bago. He rode his first train when they were moving. In Bago he lived in Lat Pyar Kan street. In Bago he attended Mcgrath Private School, located in Charch in the east of the ward. He can speak and write English because of his teacher in Charch. His school name was "Charle Hla Baw" and his younger sister's name is Ivy Hla Baw. His mother, Daw Khin Tint  died in 1940 at 38 years of age due to tuberculosis. His elder brother, U Ba Kyaw, is an artist and his second elder brother is a Japan revolutionary soldier. In 1951 he passed matriculation examination, which in that year only a small percentage of student passed. 

He had no money so he worked while he attended University. In 1952, he had no money to pay for University and due to his family issues, he left his sister and brother with his relatives who lived in Kyauk Myaung, Yangon. Fortunately, the Army called for officers so he joined and attended the 8th intake of Officers Training School, Bahtoo in March 1952. Hla Myint (Win Oo), a very well-known singer/actor of that time who later came to visit Mawlamyaing when Chit Swe was head of South Eastern Commend, and he went to Pyin Oo Lwin with the head of CSM Saw Lwin.

In 1981, he was head of North Eastern Command in Myanmar Army. In 1983, he was head of South Eastern Command and he was promoted to Brigadier General.

Bureau of Special Operations
In 1985, he was head of Bureau of Special Operations 2 in Myanmar Army, when there were only two BSO in Myanmar Army. Head of No. 1 BSO was Major General Sein Aung and on November 19, 1986, he was promoted to Major General. When he was head of BSO 2 he moved to Yangon from Mawlamyaing. In Yangon he lived in U Wi Sar Ya Road in front of Na Wa Rat Avenue. His major operations were Kayin State, Mon State, and Tanintharyi Division. In BSO he was also in charge of Than Taung in Kayin State. As BSO 2 his major enemies are KNU. His major function was to negotiate between the requirements of Regional Military Commands and Light Infantry Divisions in operations and ßKa Ka Kyi: à. Headquarter.

Korean plane crash search
He got the order from headquarters to search for the commercial plane, Boeing 737, from Korea which crashed while flying from Bahrain to Bangkok in Myanmar. First he searched Dawei, Heain dar, Taung thone Lone, Myittar, Sin Phyu Dine because this is the route to Bangkok Airport, 100 miles distant from Dawei. The plane was not found so they searched again in extensively in the Myanmar Sea. The plane was not found in the sea either. So they predicted the plane would be the place where Andersen Ship was shipwrecked.

To Singapore and Thailand
While he was in BSO2, he went to Singapore and Thailand as a member of the Myanmar goodwill delegation, in which  the leader was Maung Maung Kha, the prime minister, and other members were minister, U Ye Kaung, Major General Tint Swe, Colonel Maung Cho and minister for Foreign affairs and middle class in charges from Ministry of Foreign Affair. His duty was to observe for the future Myanmar Government Administration. He observed Setosa, business zone in downtown, urban architectures, dirty restaurants,  market of animals, the port where unofficial cargo ships from Myanmar are boarded. At night, he attended an honor dinner by Singapore Government. At dinner was the president of Singapore, and an Indian man, Mr Chandayardast, member of Parliament. He saw Mr Chandayardast first at this dinner. His habit that was not very much known to public except his very close colleagues and staffs was that, he was a chain-smoker who quit smoking because his doctor asked him to choose between his health and cigarette while he went for check-up in Singapore, his favorite drink was Gin & Tonic, his usual talking behavior is to talk with his right index-finger pointing out (his right index-finger was broken when he played soccer during his younger days), he is a very shy person who rarely change clothes or even go with shorts in the public), his hair is well-swept anytime of the day and his love for conservation of Myanmar's forests (which is why whenever he is in cabinet, some of the generals who want to deforest the National reserved forests are the ones who always argues with him).

Failure of political system and birth of new era in Myanmar
While he was in BSO 2 there are 1988 uprising. In his autobiography, he mentioned about the uprising but he said his hatred and fear of war and hurting people is his nightmare.

Minister
On September 20, 1988, he was minister of three ministries, Ministry of Agriculture and Forestry, Ministry of Co-operatives and Ministry of Livestock and Fishery. On March 18, 1990, he was promoted to Lieutenant General. Later, he was Minister of Forestry until his retirement.

Retirement
He retired on July 23, 1997. The Korean government wanted to search again for commercial airline from Korea so they send a secretary from the Korean Embassy to him and Colonel Tha Win (Retired) to enquire and stated that they wanted to search using their ship. He advised them to contact the Ministry of Foreign affair. Later he wrote the book Tay Ta Nae Mwe Ta Nae with the pen name "Naung Sit Te", which means "old soldier". He finished writing his book on September 18, 2006. He now lives happily and peacefully with his family in his residence he'd lived since 1986.

References
Tay Ta Nae Mwe Ta Nae by Naung Sit Te

1932 births
Burmese military personnel
Burmese people of Mon descent
People from Mawlamyine
Living people
Officers Training School, Bahtoo alumni